Yoodlee Films is an Indian film production company, a division of Saregama India Limited. Founded in 2017, it is headquartered in Mumbai and is being headed by Siddharth Anand Kumar. The studio credits itself for "fearless filmmaking". Their films are shot at real locations with a maximum duration not more than 120 minutes. Since its inception, Yoodlee Films has made 17 films across genres and languages. Their first film was the critically acclaimed Ajji (2017).

Films 
Yoodlee's first film Ajji directed by Devashish Makhija released in November, 2017. It is a modern-day version of the European children's story Little Red Riding Hood. Their next film Kuchh Bheege Alfaaz (2018) was directed by Onir.

Their third film ‘Abhiyum Anuvum’ was the production house's first venture in regional cinema. Brij Mohan Amar Rahe was the first Netflix Original from Yoodlee Films, released across 190 countries. ‘Noblemen’, their 6th release and a thematic representation of The Merchant of Venice, premiered at the New York Indian Film Festival in 2018 for which actor Ali Haji won the ‘Best Child Actor’ award. They ended the year 2018 with 'Hamid'- an adaptation of the play Phone No. 786 by Mohd. Amin Bhat. The film went on to win the National Film Award for Best Feature Film in Urdu at the 66th National Film Awards

K.D., was their first release of 2019. Actor Naga Vishal won the Best Actor Award at the Jagran Film Festival 2019 and Madhumita the Best Director at the UK Asian Film Festival 2019 for the same. During the 67th National Film Awards, Naga Vishal bagged the National Award for 'Best Child Artist' for his role as Kutty in the film. Their next, Chote Nawab, directed by Kumud Chaudhary won the Best Feature Film award at the Indian Film Festival of Cincinnati 2020. Habbadi, directed by Nachiket Samant, was also officially selected at the Indian Film Festival of Cincinnati 2020.

Bahut Hua Sammaan, a political satire directed by Ashish R Shukla, starring  Raghav Juyal, Abhishek Chauhan, Sanjay Mishra, Ram Kapoor, Nidhi Singh, Namit Das and Flora Saini opened to good critic reviews with Free Press Journal describing the film as "refreshing", while The New Indian Express terming the movie as "stylish and contemporary".

Their first film of 2021, was Collar Bomb which released under the banner of "Disney+Hotstar Multiplex" and went on to become the most streamed content of the week (12 - 18 July) across OTT platforms as it registered over 5.6 million views. Their next, 200: Halla Ho which stars Amol Palekar, Rinku Rajguru, Barun Sobti and Sahil Khattar in lead roles is inspired by true events and will release on 20 August on Zee5. 2021 will see the release of Zombivli, the first Marathi zombie horror comedy.

Filmography

Accolades

References

Film studios in Mumbai
2017 establishments in Maharashtra